Konglong is a town under the administration of Huangmei County, Hubei, China. , it administers the following five residential communities and 33 villages:
Zhanghe Community
Wanniantai Community
Xixiang Community
Zhanqian Avenue Community
Xin'an Community
Hongnian Village
Yanzha Village
Kongdong Village
Tangda Village
Meiba Village
Xingwei Village
Xinggang Village
Gongkou Village
Yangshulin Village
Wangba Village
Jiangyouzha Village
Hongpu Village
Wuli Village
Qili Village
Mafangkou Village
Zhangtang Village
Fudu Village
Yinwan Village
Dehua Village
Zhounian Village
Dengdu Village
Yudun Village
Fangfan Village
Andun Village
Jiangying Village
Lulü Village
Duanlü Village
Meilü Village
Wuhe Village
Changhu Village
Guohu Village
Denghu Village
Liuqiao Village

References 

Township-level divisions of Hubei
Huangmei County